The Emil Alexandrescu Stadium is a multi-purpose stadium in Iași, Romania. It is used mostly for football matches and is the home field of Politehnica Iași. The stadium is named after the former CSMS Iași player and Iași Mayor, Emil Alexandrescu. Its original capacity was 12,500 seats but after plastic seats were mounted the capacity was reduced to 11,390 seats. It is the 35th stadium in the country by capacity.

Events

Association football

See also

List of football stadiums in Romania

External links
 Official site of CSMS Iasi

References
 

 

Football venues in Romania
Buildings and structures in Iași
Multi-purpose stadiums in Romania
Sports venues completed in 1960
Sport in Iași
Buildings and structures in Iași County